Gerónimo Barbadillo González (born September 29, 1954) is a retired Peruvian footballer.

A right winger, he spent his best seasons with Tigres UANL of the Liga MX and was known for his speed, dribbling and goal-scoring ability. He also played for Avellino and Udinese in Serie A. He participated in the 1982 FIFA World Cup with the Peru national football team. 

He is nicknamed "Patrulla" ("Patrol") because of his afro hairstyle the resemblanced to Linc Hayes (played by Clarence Williams III) in the American TV series "The Mod Squad" due the Spanish translation of the name of the show, which is "Patrulla Juvenil". 

An icon of Tigres UANL, the team honored him when they retired the kit number 7.

Biography
Barbadillo started playing in 1972 with Sport Boys. In 1974, he moved to play for Defensor Lima. In 1975, he arrived in Monterrey, Mexico to play for Tigres UANL. With Tigres he conquered a domestic cup or Copa México against Club América in 1976 and two Mexican League championships, first against Pumas UNAM in 1978 and against Atlante in 1982. He scored over 60 goals in six years and formed a special association in the pitch with Mexican historical creative midfielder Tomás Boy. Aside from his goalscoring, Barbadillo also played 17 Clásico Regiomontano derby matches against Monterrey, Tigres' main rival. Because he is considered one of the best players the team has ever had, his number, #7, has been retired and immortalized.

Barbadillo then moved in 1982 to Italy to play for Avellino, after his magnificent performance in the FIFA World Cup. He played later for Udinese in 1985–86. He has retired as a player and lives in Italy. He has been in charge of Udinese's youth team since 2005.

Honours

Tigres UANL
Primera División
Winner (2): 1977–78, 1981–82
Runner-up (1): 1979–80
Copa de Mexico
Winner (1): 1975–76

Peru national football team
Copa America
Winner (1): 1975

Individual
Mexican Primera División Golden Ball: 1981–82

External links
rsssf: Peru - record international footballers

References

1954 births
Footballers from Lima
1975 Copa América players
1982 FIFA World Cup players
Living people
Peru international footballers
Peruvian footballers
Peruvian expatriate footballers
Sport Boys footballers
Tigres UANL footballers
U.S. Avellino 1912 players
Udinese Calcio players
Peruvian Primera División players
Liga MX players
Serie A players
Expatriate footballers in Italy
Expatriate footballers in Mexico
Peruvian expatriate sportspeople in Italy
Peruvian expatriate sportspeople in Mexico
Copa América-winning players
Association football wingers